Orpheus (also the title used in the UK) is a 1950 French film directed by Jean Cocteau and starring Jean Marais. It is the central part of Cocteau's Orphic Trilogy, which consists of The Blood of a Poet (1930), Orpheus (1950), and Testament of Orpheus (1960).

Plot
Set in contemporary Paris, the story of the film is a variation of the classic Greek myth of Orpheus and Eurydice. The picture begins with Orpheus (Marais), a famous poet, visiting the Café des Poètes. At the same time, a Princess (Casares) and Cégeste (Édouard Dermit), a handsome young poet whom she supports, arrive. The drunken Cégeste starts a brawl. When the police arrive and attempt to take Cégeste into custody, he breaks free and flees, only to be run down by two motorcycle riders. The Princess has the police place Cégeste into her car in order to "transport him to the hospital". She also orders Orpheus into the car in order to act as a witness. Once in the car, Orpheus discovers Cégeste is dead and that the Princess is not going to the hospital. Instead, they drive to a chateau (the landscape through the car windows is presented in negative) accompanied by the two motorcycle riders as abstract poetry plays on the radio. This takes the form of seemingly meaningless messages, like those broadcast to the French Resistance from London during the Occupation.

At the ruined chateau, the Princess reanimates Cégeste into a zombie-like state, and she, Cégeste, and the two motorcycle riders (the Princess' henchmen) disappear into a mirror, leaving Orpheus alone. He wakes in a desolate landscape, where he stumbles on the Princess' chauffeur, Heurtebise (Périer), who has been waiting for Orpheus to arrive. Heurtebise drives Orpheus home where Orpheus' pregnant wife Eurydice (Déa), a police inspector, and Eurydice's friend Aglaonice (head of the "League of Women", and apparently in love with Eurydice) discuss Orpheus' mysterious disappearance. When Orpheus comes home, he refuses to explain the details of the previous night despite the questions which linger over the fate of Cégeste, whose body cannot be found. Orpheus invites Heurtebise to live in his house and to store the Rolls in Orpheus' garage, should the Princess return. Eurydice attempts to tell Orpheus that she is with child, but is silenced when he rebuffs her.

While Heurtebise falls in love with Eurydice, Orpheus becomes obsessed with listening to the abstract poetry which only comes through the Rolls' radio, and it is revealed that the Princess is apparently Death (or one of the suborders of Death). Cocteau himself commented on such interpretation:

"Among the misconceptions which have been written about Orphée, I still see Heurtebise described as an angel and the Princess as Death. In the film, there is no Death and no angel. There can be none. Heurtebise is a young Death serving in one of the numerous sub-orders of Death, and the Princess is no more Death than an air hostess is an angel. I never touch on dogmas. The region that I depict is a border on life, a no man's land where one hovers between life and death".

When Eurydice is killed by Death's henchmen, Heurtebise proposes to lead Orpheus through the Zone (depicted as a ruined city – actually the ruins of Saint-Cyr military academy) into the Underworld in order to reclaim her. Orpheus reveals that he may have fallen in love with Death who has visited him in his dreams. Heurtebise asks Orpheus which woman he will betray: Death or Eurydice. Orpheus enters the afterlife by donning a pair of surgical gloves left behind by the Princess after Eurydice's death.

In the Underworld, Orpheus finds himself as a plaintiff before a tribunal which interrogates all parties involved in the death of Eurydice. The tribunal declares that Death has illegally claimed Eurydice, and they return Eurydice to life, with one condition: Orpheus may not look upon her for the rest of his life on pain of losing her again. Orpheus agrees and returns home with Eurydice. They are accompanied by Heurtebise, who has been assigned by the tribunal to assist the couple in adapting to their new, restrictive, life together.

Eurydice visits the garage where Orpheus constantly listens to the Rolls' radio in search of the unknown poetry. She sits in the backseat. When Orpheus glances at her in the mirror, Eurydice disappears. A mob from the Café des Poètes (stirred to action by Aglaonice) arrives in order to extract vengeance from Orpheus for what they suppose to be his part in the murder of Cégeste. Orpheus confronts them, armed with a pistol given to him by Heurtebise, but is disarmed and shot. Orpheus dies and finds himself in the Underworld. This time, he declares his love to Death who has decided to herself die in order that he might become an "immortal poet". The tribunal this time sends Orpheus and Eurydice back to the living world with no memories of the previous events. Orpheus learns that he is to be a father, and his life begins anew. Death and Heurtebise, meanwhile, walk through the ruins of the Underworld towards an even worse fate than death - to become judges themselves.

Interpretation
Cocteau wrote in The Art of Cinema:
"The three basic themes of Orphée are:
The successive deaths through which a poet must pass before he becomes, in that admirable line from Mallarmé, tel qu'en lui-même enfin l'éternité le change—changed into himself at last by eternity.
The theme of immortality: the person who represents Orphée's Death sacrifices herself and abolishes herself to make the poet immortal.
Mirrors: we watch ourselves grow old in mirrors. They bring us closer to death.

The other themes are a mixture of Orphic and modern myth: for example, cars that talk (the radio receivers in cars).

Orphée is a realistic film; or, to be more precise, observing Goethe's distinction between reality and truth, a film in which I express a truth peculiar to myself. If that truth is not the spectator's, and if his personality conflicts with mine and rejects it, he accuses me of lying. I am even astonished that so many people can still be penetrated by another's ideas, in a country noted for its individualism.

While Orphée does encounter some lifeless audiences, it also encounters others that are open to my dream and agree to be put to sleep and to dream it with me (accepting the logic by which dreams operate, which is implacable, although it is not governed by our logic).

I am only talking about the mechanics, since Orphée is not at all a dream in itself: through a wealth of detail similar to that which we find in dreams, it summarizes my way of living and my conception of life".

Main cast
 Jean Marais as Orphée
 François Périer as Heurtebise
 María Casares as The Princess – Death
 Marie Déa as Eurydice
 Henri Crémieux as L'éditeur
 Juliette Gréco as Aglaonice
 Roger Blin as The Poet
 Édouard Dermit as Jacques Cégeste
 René Worms as Judge

Production
In his autobiography, the actor Jean-Pierre Aumont claimed that Cocteau wrote the film for him and his then-wife Maria Montez, but then decided to make it with other actors.

Reception
The 1950 release of Orpheus figured as a watershed in the evolving poetics of many emergent American poets, including Robert Duncan, Jack Spicer, Frank O'Hara and Allen Ginsberg. The film was taken very seriously and had a strong impact in the world of practicing artists in all genres. In 2000, critic Roger Ebert added Orpheus to his "Great Movies" list, praising the simple but ingenious special effects, and writing: "Seeing Orpheus today is like glimpsing a cinematic realm that has passed completely from the scene. Films are rarely made for purely artistic reasons, experiments are discouraged, and stars as big as Marais are not cast in eccentric remakes of Greek myths. The story in Cocteau's hands becomes unexpectedly complex; we see that it is not simply about love, death and jealousy, but also about how art can seduce the artist away from ordinary human concerns".

The Japanese filmmaker Akira Kurosawa cited Orpheus as one of his favorite films.

Adaptation and legacy
In 1993, Philip Glass adapted the film as a stage opera, Orphée, with a libretto by the composer taken directly from Cocteau's screenplay. Jointly commissioned by the American Repertory Theater and the Brooklyn Academy of Music, the work had its premiere on May 14 at the American Repertory Theater.

Francesca Zambello directed the premiere, and the production, closely based on the imagery of the film, was by frequent Glass collaborator Robert Israel. Baritone Eugene Perry originated the role of Orphée, with Wendy Hill as the Princess, Richard Fracker as Heurtebise, and Elizabeth Futral as Eurydice.

In 2007, the opera was revived at Glimmerglass conducted by Anne Manson, and Manson also conducted a recording with the Portland Opera in 2010. New York Times critic Anthony Tommasini, following a negative review by the paper's Edward Rothstein of the opera's premiere, wrote about the release of the recording, "14 years after my first hearing, I was swept away by Orphée".

See also
 List of avant-garde films of the 1950s

References

External links
 
 
 
 Orpheus an essay by Jean Cocteau at the Criterion Collection
 Orpheus: Through a Glass, Amorously an essay by Mark Polizzotti at the Criterion Collection

1950 films
1950s fantasy films
Existentialist films
French black-and-white films
Films set in Paris
Films based on classical mythology
Films directed by Jean Cocteau
French fantasy films
1950s French-language films
1950s romantic fantasy films
Orpheus
Films scored by Georges Auric
Films with screenplays by Jean Cocteau
French romantic fantasy films
1950s French films